Chizhi is a rural locality (a selo) in Borodachyovskoye Rural Settlement, Zhirnovsky District, Volgograd Oblast, Russia. The population was 36 as of 2010. There are 2 streets.

Geography 
Chizhi is located in forest steppe of Volga Upland, 61 km south of Zhirnovsk (the district's administrative centre) by road. Borodachi is the nearest rural locality.

References 

Rural localities in Zhirnovsky District